Teenage Jesus and the Jerks is a compilation album by Teenage Jesus and the Jerks, released in 1979 by Migraine Records.

Track listing

Personnel
Adapted from the Teenage Jesus and the Jerks liner notes.

Teenage Jesus and the Jerks
 Bradley Field – drums, percussion
 Lydia Lunch – vocals, electric guitar
 Jim Sclavunos – bass guitar (A1–A5)
 Gordon Stevenson – bass guitar (B1, B2)

Production and additional personnel
 Woody Payne – production (A4, A5)
 Robert Quine – production (A1–A3, B1, B2)

Release history

References

External links 
 

1979 compilation albums
Teenage Jesus and the Jerks albums